William H. Brand (April 20, 1824 Leonardsville, Madison County, New York – 1891) was an American merchant and politician from New York.

Life
He attended the district schools and the Oneida Institute. Then he taught school, became a clerk in a country store, and later opened his own business.

He was a member of the New York State Assembly (Madison Co., 1st D.) in 1862 and 1863; Supervisor of the Town of Brookfield from 1867 to 1869; and a member of the New York State Senate (21st D.) in 1870 and 1871.

He was buried at the Seventh Day Baptist Cemetery in Leonardsville.

Sources
 The New York Civil List compiled by Franklin Benjamin Hough, Stephen C. Hutchins and Edgar Albert Werner (1870; pg. 444, 496 and 498)
 Life Sketches of Executive Officers, and Members of the Legislature of the State of New York, Vol. III by H. H. Boone & Theodore P. Cook (1870; pg. 64ff)

External links

1824 births
1891 deaths
Republican Party New York (state) state senators
People from Brookfield, New York
Republican Party members of the New York State Assembly
Town supervisors in New York (state)
19th-century American politicians
Oneida Institute alumni